This article is about the participation of women in chess and its culture.

Women's chess competitions
The majority of chess tournaments are open to all participants regardless of gender. Very few, if any, international tournaments are restricted to men, but a few are restricted to women, most prominently the Women's World Chess Championship and the Women's Chess Olympiad. The World Junior Chess Championship and World Youth Chess Championship also include concurrent girls' championships in various age divisions. Many countries hold, in addition to the national championship, a separate women's national championship.

The first Women's World Chess Championship was held in 1927 and won by Vera Menchik. The current champion is Ju Wenjun; the higher rated Hou Yifan, after winning the championship three times, has declined to participate since 2016.

Women in chess coaching
In 2010, as the head coach for the Texas Tech Knight Raiders chess team, Susan Polgar became the first woman to lead a men's Division I chess team to the Final Four. In April 2011 the Texas Tech Knight Raiders won the President's Cup; this made Polgar the first female head coach to lead a men's Division I chess team to the national title.

Gender differences in chess achievement

Judit Polgár, generally considered the strongest female player of all time, was at one time the eighth highest rated player in the world, and remains the only woman to have ever been rated in the world's top ten. Three women, Maia Chiburdanidze, Polgár, and Hou Yifan, have been ranked in the world's top 100 players.

Analysis of rating statistics of German players in an article from 2009 by Merim Bilalić, Kieran Smallbone, Peter McLeod, and Fernand Gobet indicated that although the highest-rated men were stronger than the highest-rated women, the difference (usually more than 200 rating points) was largely accounted for by the relatively smaller pool of women players (only one-sixteenth of rated German players were women). In 2020, psychologist and neuroscientist Wei Ji Ma summarized the state of research on women in chess as "there is currently zero evidence for biological differences in chess ability between the genders" but added "that does not mean that there are certainly no such differences."

Possible reasons
Chess players, both men and women, have speculated on the reasons behind the gap in chess achievements by women compared to men. Some women players believe the major reason is due to cultural expectations and bias. Jennifer Shahade, a FIDE Woman Grandmaster and the women's program director at the United States Chess Federation (USCF), said there is a large drop-off of girls at the USCF around the ages of 12 and 13, which she attributes to the lack of a social network for girls that age in chess. Polgár said that society and some parents may weaken the desire of young female chess players to improve, and that women were often held back by lower ambition by choosing to compete in all-women tournaments rather than open tournaments. Jovanka Houska, an International Master and Woman Grandmaster, argued that overconfidence by boys gives an advantage over girls.

In a 2007 study at the University of Padua, male and female players of similar ability were matched up with each other on online games. When the players were unaware of their opponent's sex, female players won slightly under half their games. When female players were told their opponent was male, they played less aggressively, and they won about one in four games. However, when female players were told their opponent was female, even though they were actually male, they were as aggressive as the male players and won about one in two games. The researchers argued that gender stereotypes may have led female players to lower their self-esteem and self-confidence when they know they are playing male players, causing them to play defensively which worsened their performance.

Sexism in chess
Polgár, Shahade and Houska said that they have encountered sexism, including belittling comments about their abilities, opponents who refused to shake hands, and online trolls questioning if girls and women belong in chess.

Some male players have commented negatively on women's performance in chess. In a 1963 interview, Bobby Fischer was dismissive of female players, calling them "terrible" and said it was because "[women] are not so smart". In 2015, Nigel Short argued that male players performed better because men and women were "hard-wired" for different skills, which was met with controversy. In 2022, Ilya Smirin, while broadcasting live during the ninth round of the FIDE Women's Grand Prix 2022-23, said that chess was "maybe not for women", and also praised a woman for playing like a man. FIDE apologized through Twitter and called Smirin's comments embarrasing and offensive. The same day FIDE fired Smirin for making "offensive remarks".

Culture

Margret the Adroit may have made the 12th-century Lewis chessmen. In 2010 at a conference at the National Museum of Scotland on the Lewis chessmen, Gudmundur Thorarinsson (a civil engineer and a former member of the Icelandic Parliament) and Einar S. Einarsson (a former president of Visa Iceland and a friend of the chess champion Bobby Fischer) argued that Margret the Adroit made them. It is a claim that the American author Nancy Marie Brown supports in her 2015 book, Ivory Vikings, the Mystery of the Most Famous Chessmen in the World and the Woman Who Made Them.

Caïssa ("Ka-ee-sah") is a fictional (anachronistic) Thracian dryad portrayed as the goddess of chess. She was first mentioned during the Renaissance by Italian poet Hieronymus Vida.

Historically chess has had many variants. In chess today the queen is the name of the most powerful chess piece. Historian Marilyn Yalom has argued that the queen was able to become the most dangerous piece on the board in the late 15th century because of the example of powerful female rulers in that era of European history.

History of women in chess

Early history and romantic era of chess

In the Middle Ages, Macalda di Scaletta played chess, and historical evidence suggests that she was probably the first person in Sicily who learned how to play it.
Queen Elizabeth I, who lived from 1533 until 1603, played chess very well, according to a placard in the Tower of London.

Benjamin Franklin, who lived from 1706 until 1790, according to Thomas Jefferson played chess in Paris with socially important women, including the Duchess of Bourbon Bathilde d'Orléans, who was "a chess player of about his force".

Milestones and beginning of tournament participation
In 1884 the first women's chess tournament was held; it was sponsored by the Sussex Chess Association. In 1897 the first women's international chess tournament was held, which Mary Rudge won. In 1927 the first Women's World Chess Championship was held, which Vera Menchik won.

In 1950 Lyudmila Rudenko became the first female International Master.

The first Women’s Chess Olympiad was held in 1957 and won by the Soviet Union team.

In 1976 Rohini Khadilkar became the first female to compete in the Indian Men's Championship. Her involvement in a male competition caused a furore that necessitated a successful appeal to the High Court and caused the World Chess Federation president, Max Euwe, to rule that women cannot be barred from national and international championships. In 1978 Nona Gaprindashvili became the first female Grandmaster.

In 1996 Judit Polgár became the first woman to be ranked in the top ten of all chess players, in 2002 she became the first female chess player to defeat the reigning world number one (Garry Kasparov) in a game, and in 2005 she became the first female player to play for a small-scale World Chess Championship, which she did in the FIDE World Chess Championship 2005; she had previously participated in large, 100+ player knockout tournaments for the world championship, but this was a small 8-player invitational.

21st century and online chess era

Recently, Hou Yifan has been the leading female chess player, for example winning the Biel GM tournament in 2017.

In February 2017, the Iranian Chess Federation banned Dorsa Derakhshani from playing for the national team or in national tournaments after she played in the 2017 Gibraltar Chess Festival without wearing a hijab.

The 2015 Women's World Champion, Mariya Muzychuk, and US Women's Champion Nazí Paikidze elected not to attend the Women's World Chess Championship 2017, out of protest at the tournament's location in Iran, where participants were required to wear a hijab in public. In December 2022, Iranian player Sarasadat Khademalsharieh planned not to return to Iran after not wearing a hijab during the FIDE World Rapid and Blitz Chess Championships, amid protests against the Iranian government.

In 2021 FIDE announced the largest-yet sponsorship deal for women's chess, with the breast enlargement company Motiva; this move met with both criticism and support from female chess players. FIDE declared 2022 the "Year of Woman in Chess".

Timeline of women in chess
 1884: The first women's chess tournament was held; it was sponsored by the Sussex Chess Association.
 1897: The first women’s international chess tournament was held, which Mary Rudge won.
 1922: María Teresa Mora became the first woman to win the Cuban Chess Championship.
 1927: Vera Menchik won the first Women's World Chess Championship.

 1950: Lyudmila Rudenko became the first female International Master.
 1950: Chantal Chaudé de Silans became the first woman to play at a Chess Olympiad.
 1950: FIDE introduced the Woman International Master title.
 1957: The first Women’s Chess Olympiad was held in 1957 and won by the Soviet Union team.
 1961: Lisa Lane appeared on the cover of Sports Illustrated in the August 7, 1961 edition, making her the first chess player of any gender to appear on its cover.
 1976: Rohini Khadilkar became the first female to compete in the Indian Men's Championship. Her involvement in a male competition caused a furore that necessitated a successful appeal to the High Court and caused the World Chess Federation president, Max Euwe, to rule that women cannot be barred from national and international championships.
 1976: FIDE introduced the Woman Grandmaster title.
 1978: Nona Gaprindashvili became the first female Grandmaster.
 1978: FIDE introduced the Woman FIDE Master title.
 1986: FIDE decided to grant 100 bonus Elo rating points to all active female players except Susan Polgár, which knocked her from the top spot in the January 1987 FIDE ratings list. The rationale was that the FIDE ratings of women were not commensurate with the ratings of the men because the women tended to play in women-only tournaments, Polgar being an exception because up to that point she had played mainly against men.
 1991: Judit Polgár became the first woman to be the youngest-ever Grandmaster.
 1992: Gisela Kahn Gresser became the first woman to be inducted into the U.S. Chess Hall of Fame.
 1993: Judit Polgár became the first woman to qualify for an Interzonal tournament.
 1996: Judit Polgár became the first woman to be ranked in the top ten of all chess players.
 1998: Judit Polgár became the first woman to win the U.S. Open Chess Championship. She shared the tournament victory with Boris Gulko as each scored 8–1.
 2002: FIDE introduced the Woman Candidate Master title.
 2002: Judit Polgár became the first female player to defeat the reigning world number one in a game, beating Garry Kasparov.
 2003: Susan Polgár became the first woman to win the U.S. Open Blitz Championship.
 2003: Susan Polgár became the first woman to be named "Grandmaster of the Year" by the United States Chess Federation.
 2005: Judit Polgár became the first female player to play for a small-scale World Chess Championship, which she did in the FIDE World Chess Championship 2005; she had previously participated in large, 100+ player knockout tournaments for the world championship, but this was a small 8-player invitational. 
 2011: Vera Menchik became the first woman inducted into the World Chess Hall of Fame.
 2013: Alexandra Kosteniuk became the first woman to win the men's Swiss Chess Championship.
 2022: FIDE declared 2022 the "Year of Woman in Chess".

See also

List of female chess players
Women's chess in Australia
The Queen's Gambit, 2020 miniseries

References

Further reading

External links
 Women’s chess: ‘It is not biology’

 
Women in sports